Khabarsky District is an administrative and municipal district (raion), one of the fifty-nine in Altai Krai, Russia. It is located in the northwest of the krai. Its administrative center is the rural locality (a selo) of Khabary. Population:  The population of the administrative center accounts for 33.8% of the district's total population.

Geography
Khabarsky District is located in the northwest region of Altai Krai, on flat terrain of the Kulundra Steppe of the West Siberian Plain.  The meandering floodplain of the Burla river runs across the middle of the district, and through the administrative center of Khabary.  Approximately 55% of the territory is arable land, and 20% is pasture.  

The Burla river has its sources in the district. Along the river are small islands of pine forests, which are one of the tourist attractions of the area.  The district is 240 km west of the regional city of Barnaul, and 2,600 km east of Moscow.  The area measures 60 km (north-south), and 80 km (west-east); total area is 2,800 km2 (about 3% of Altai Krai).

The district is bordered on the north by Novosibirsk Oblast, on the east by Pankrushikhinsky District, on the south by Nemetsky National District, and on the west by Burlinsky District.

Administrative divisions
Within the framework of administrative divisions, the district is divided into ten selsoviets: Khabarsky, Korotoyasky, Martovsky, Michurinsky, Novoilyinsky, Plyoso-Kuryinsky, Sverdlovsky, Topolinsky, Utyansky, and Zyatkovo-Rechensky.

References

Notes

Sources

Districts of Altai Krai

